Tharpyna is a genus of spiders in the family Thomisidae. It was first described in 1874 by L. Koch. , it contains 12 species from Australia, India, and Indonesia.

Species
Tharpyna comprises the following species:
Tharpyna albosignata L. Koch, 1876 – Australia (Queensland, New South Wales)
Tharpyna campestrata L. Koch, 1874 – Australia (Queensland, Western Australia)
Tharpyna decorata Karsch, 1878 – Australia (New South Wales)
Tharpyna diademata L. Koch, 1874 – Australia (mainland, Lord Howe Is.)
Tharpyna himachalensis Tikader & Biswas, 1979 – India
Tharpyna hirsuta L. Koch, 1875 – Australia
Tharpyna indica Tikader & Biswas, 1979 – India
Tharpyna munda L. Koch, 1875 – Australia
Tharpyna simpsoni Hickman, 1944 – Australia (South Australia)
Tharpyna speciosa Rainbow, 1920 – Australia (Lord Howe Is.)
Tharpyna varica Thorell, 1890 – Indonesia (Java)
Tharpyna venusta (L. Koch, 1874) – Australia (New South Wales)

References

Thomisidae
Araneomorphae genera
Spiders of Australia
Spiders of Indonesia
Spiders of the Indian subcontinent